The Ponta Grossa River is a river of Paraná state in southern Brazil. 

The Ponta Grossa River forms where the Ribeirão Pulador, which drains the Campinhos State Park, joins the Tigre River. 
The Ponta Grossa River is in turn a right tributary of the Ribeira de Iguape River.

See also
List of rivers of Paraná

References

Rivers of Paraná (state)